Nicholas James Strausfeld FRS (b. 1942) is Regents Professor at the Department of Neuroscience at the University of Arizona, Tucson  and Director, Center for Insect Science, University of Arizona.

He received a B.Sc. and Ph.D. at University College, London.

Awards
1994 Guggenheim Fellow
1995 MacArthur Fellows Program
2002 Fellow of the Royal Society

Works
"Dimorphic Olfactory Lobes in the Arthropoda", International Symposium on Olfaction and Taste, Editor Thomas E. Finger, John Wiley and Sons, 2009, 
"Pathways in Dipteran Insects for Early Visual Motion Processing", Motion vision: computational, neural, and ecological constraints, Editors Johannes M. Zanker, Jochen Zeil, Springer, 2001, 
"Oculomotor Control in Insects", Neurons, Networks, and Motor Behavior, Editors Paul S. G. Stein, Sten Grillner, Douglas G. Stuart, Allen I. Selverston, MIT Press, 1999,

References

External links
Flybrain
"N Strausfeld", Biomed Central

1942 births
Living people
MacArthur Fellows
Fellows of the Royal Society
Alumni of University College London
University of Arizona faculty
British entomologists
Academics of University College London
British neuroscientists